Daniel Schmidt may refer to:

 Daniel Schmidt (baseball) (born 1988), Australian baseball pitcher
 Daniel Schmidt (footballer) (born 1992), footballer
 Daniel Schmidt (musician) (born 1942), composer and builder of American gamelan
 Daniel Schmidt (gymnast) (born 1991), German trampolinist
 Daniel Schmidt (filmmaker) (born 1984), American filmmaker

See also
 Daniel Schmid (1941–2006), Swiss theatre and film director
 Daniel Schmid (bobsledder) (born 1976), Swiss bobsledder
 Dan Schmid (born 1962), American musician